Tanjung Klingon is a mukim and town in Melaka Tengah District, Malacca, Malaysia.

Infrastructures

Tourist attractions

Gallery

See also
 List of cities and towns in Malaysia by population

References

Central Melaka District
Mukims of Malacca